Cosmopterix is a large genus of moth in the family Cosmopterigidae (cosmet moths).

Description

Adult

Cosmopterix species are very small to small moths with a forewing length of 2.9-6.5 mm. Head smooth-scaled, rather long and narrow caused by the large and bent scales on the vertex; frons distinctly lighter than vertex, from vertex to neck tufts often a median and/or two lateral white lines; antenna three-quarters to four-fifths of the length of forewing, often slightly serrate distally, and generally with a white, often partly interrupted, anterior line and several white sections in the apical part; labial palpus cylindrical, porrect, apical segment strongly angled upwards and often reaching well above the head. Thorax with or without a median white line, tegulae often lined white inwardly. Forewing narrowly lanceolate with long and very narrowly protruding apex and usually with a very characteristic yellow or orange fascia beyond the middle, this fascia bordered by tubercular metallic fasciae or spots; basal area with a metallic fascia or spots or with three to six longitudinal lines of different length, cilia concolorous around apex, paler towards dorsum. Hindwing almost linear, less than half the width of forewing and acutely pointed, from pale yellow to dark grey, without markings, cilia concolorous without ciliary lines. The forewing can generally be divided into three parts: The basal area from base to middle of wing, followed by the broad transverse fascia and beyond this the apical area. The basal area generally with a series of longitudinal lines, often very narrow or a single and oblique, sometimes interrupted, fascia. The lines are mentioned from costa to dorsum as the costal, the subcostal, the medial, the subdorsal and the dorsal line. The transverse fascia is strikingly coloured from pale yellow to orange and in combination with the narrow wings it makes the species of Cosmopterix and Pebobs easy recognisable. The transverse fascia is always more or less edged on both sides by fasciae or spots. These fascia or spots consist of very strikingly silver or golden metallic coloured tubercular scales. Some species partly or completely lack the yellowish colour of the transverse fascia. However, the presence of the ‘fascia’ can be observed by the lining tubercular fasciae or spots. The transverse fascia can be edged by a combination of inner and outer fasciae and/or by an inner and outer (sub)costal and (sub)dorsal spots. Sometimes the (sub)costal and (sub)dorsal spots are situated inside the transverse fascia. The apical area is generally concolorous with the basal area, but occasionally the colouration differs. In the centre or on the dorsal side of the apical area is a longitudinal apical line, running from the transverse fascia to apex of forewing. This line is often interrupted or only present as one or more dots or streaks. Markings of the costal and dorsal cilia of the forewing are as follows: a white streak from outer costal spot in almost all of the species, a white streak or spot connected to the apical line is very common, and occasionally there is a white streak from outer dorsal spot. For identification of the species by the external features, mainly the markings of the head, thorax and forewing are of diagnostic importance. Wing venation with 12 veins in forewing and 7 veins in hindwing. Forewing with Sc and R1-R4 to costa; R5 directing towards the narrow tip; M1-CuA2 to termen; CuP very weak and not reaching termen; 1A+2A with basal fork, to dorsum. Hindwing Sc and Rs to costa; M1-CuA2 to termen; veins often not fully developed due to the narrow shape of the hindwing.

Biology
The larvae are leaf miners on a large diversity of usually herbaceous plants. They have been found oligophagous or even monophagous on the following plant families: Asteraceae, Cannabaceae, Convolvulaceae, Cyperaceae, Poaceae, Fabaceae, Urticaceae. The mines are blotch mines and in several species the larvae more or less frequently change mines. Larvae of other species stay in a single mine during their complete development and leave the mine only prior to pupation or pupate inside the mine. In several species the larva constructs a silken tunnel inside the mine in which it hides when not feeding or when disturbed. In colder climates species usually have one generation where hibernation takes place in the larval stage in a cocoon in or outside the mine. Pupation takes place in spring. In warmer climates the species have more than one, sometimes overlapping, generations.

For Cosmopterix gomezpompai a twirling behaviour has been observed by the adult. In this case the moth runs on the upper side of a leaf and simultaneously makes very fast circling movements. As soon as it comes across something unusual on the surface, like a spot, the circling slows down and is concentrated on that spot. It appears that it is feeding mostly on the dark brown spots (most likely a part of a bird dropping) on the leaf. Probably the moth is looking for nutrition. The twirling behaviour, without the possible feeding, has also been observed with Cosmopterix pulchrimella in Greece. This behaviour is described for Cosmopterix victor and also for a species of the family Gelechiidae.

Selected species

Cosmopterix abnormalis Walsingham, 1897
Cosmopterix aculeata Meyrick, 1909
Cosmopterix acutivalva Kuroko, 1987
Cosmopterix adrastea Koster, 2010
Cosmopterix albicaudis Meyrick, 1932
Cosmopterix amalthea Koster, 2010
Cosmopterix anadoxa Meyrick, 1909
Cosmopterix ananke Koster, 2010
Cosmopterix ancalodes Meyrick, 1909
Cosmopterix ancistraea Meyrick, 1913
Cosmopterix angoonae Kuroko, 1987
Cosmopterix antemidora Meyrick, 1909 
Cosmopterix antichorda Meyrick, 1909
Cosmopterix aphranassa Meyrick, 1926
Cosmopterix argentifera Koster, 2010
Cosmopterix argentitegulella Sinev, 1985
Cosmopterix artifica Meyrick, 1909
Cosmopterix asiatica Stainton, 1859
Cosmopterix asignella Sinev, 1988
Cosmopterix astrapias Walsingham, 1909
Cosmopterix asymmetrella Sinev, 1993
Cosmopterix athesiae Huemer & Koster 2006
Cosmopterix attenuatella Walker, 1864
Cosmopterix aurella Bradley, 1959
Cosmopterix aurotegulae Koster, 2010
Cosmopterix bacata Hodges, 1962
Cosmopterix bactrophora Meyrick, 1908
Cosmopterix baihashanella Kuroko & Y.Q. Liu, 2005
Cosmopterix bambusae Meyrick, 1917
Cosmopterix basilisca Meyrick, 1909
Cosmopterix beckeri Koster, 2010
Cosmopterix belonacma Meyrick, 1909
Cosmopterix bichromella Sinev & Park, 1994
Cosmopterix bifidiguttata Kuroko & Y.Q. Liu, 2005
Cosmopterix brachyclina Meyrick, 1933
Cosmopterix brevicaudella Kuroko & Y.Q. Liu, 2005
Cosmopterix callichalca Meyrick, 1922
Cosmopterix callinympha Meyrick, 1913
Cosmopterix calliochra Turner, 1926
Cosmopterix callisto Koster, 2010
Cosmopterix calypso Meyrick, 1919
Cosmopterix carpo Koster, 2010
Cosmopterix catharacma Meyrick, 1909
Cosmopterix chalcelata Turner, 1923
Cosmopterix chaldene Koster, 2010
Cosmopterix chalupae Koster, 2010
Cosmopterix chalybaeella Walsingham, 1889
Cosmopterix chasanica Sinev, 1985
Cosmopterix chisosensis Hodges, 1978
Cosmopterix chlorochalca Meyrick, 1915
Cosmopterix chlorochalca Meyrick, 1915
Cosmopterix chrysobela Meyrick, 1928
Cosmopterix chrysocrates Meyrick, 1919
Cosmopterix circe Meyrick, 1921
Cosmopterix citrinopa Meyrick, 1915
Cosmopterix clandestinella Busck, 1906
Cosmopterix clemensella Stainton, 1860
Cosmopterix cleophanes Meyrick, 1937
Cosmopterix cognita Walsingham, 1891
Cosmopterix complicata Kuroko, 1987
Cosmopterix coryphaea Walsingham, 1908
Cosmopterix crassicervicella Chretien, 1896
Cosmopterix cuprea Lower, 1916 
Cosmopterix cyclopaea Meyrick, 1909
Cosmopterix dacryodes Meyrick, 1911 
Cosmopterix damnosa Hodges, 1962
Cosmopterix dapifera Hodges, 1962
Cosmopterix delicatella Walsingham, 1889
Cosmopterix diandra Clarke, 1986
Cosmopterix diaphora Walsingham, 1909
Cosmopterix diplozona Meyrick, 1921
Cosmopterix dulcivora Meyrick, 1919
Cosmopterix ebriola Hodges, 1962
Cosmopterix emmolybda Meyrick, 1914
Cosmopterix epismaragda Meyrick, 1932
Cosmopterix epizona Meyrick, 1897
Cosmopterix erasmia Meyrick, 1915
Cosmopterix erethista Meyrick, 1909
Cosmopterix erinome Koster, 2010
Cosmopterix ermolaevi Sinev, 1985
Cosmopterix etmylaurae Koster, 2010
Cosmopterix euanthe Koster, 2010
Cosmopterix eukelade Koster, 2010
Cosmopterix euporie Koster, 2010
Cosmopterix facunda Hodges, 1978
Cosmopterix feminella Sinev, 1988
Cosmopterix fernaldella Walsingham, 1882
Cosmopterix flava Sinev, 1986
Cosmopterix flavidella Kuroko, 2011
Cosmopterix floridanella Beutenmüller, 1889
Cosmopterix fulminella Stringer, 1930
Cosmopterix galapagosensis Landry, 2001
Cosmopterix ganymedes Koster, 2010
Cosmopterix geminella Sinev, 1985
Cosmopterix gemmiferella Clemens, 1860
Cosmopterix gielisorum Koster, 2010
Cosmopterix glaucogramma Meyrick, 1934
Cosmopterix gloriosa Meyrick, 1922
Cosmopterix gomezpompai Koster, 2010
Cosmopterix gracilis Sinev, 1985
Cosmopterix gramineella Kuroko, 1987
Cosmopterix hamifera Meyrick, 1909
Cosmopterix harpalyke Koster, 2010
Cosmopterix heliactis Meyrick, 1897
Cosmopterix helike Koster, 2010
Cosmopterix hermippe Koster, 2010
Cosmopterix hieraspis Meyrick, 1924
Cosmopterix himalia Koster, 2010
Cosmopterix holophracta Meyrick, 1909
Cosmopterix inaugurata Meyrick, 1922
Cosmopterix infundibulella Sinev, 1988
Cosmopterix ingeniosa Meyrick, 1909
Cosmopterix inopis Hodges, 1962
Cosmopterix interfracta Meyrick, 1922
Cosmopterix io Koster, 2010
Cosmopterix iocaste Koster, 2010
Cosmopterix iphigona Meyrick, 1915
Cosmopterix irrubricata Walsingham, 1909
Cosmopterix isoteles Meyrick, 1919
Cosmopterix isotoma Meyrick, 1915
Cosmopterix issikiella Kuroko, 1957
Cosmopterix javanica Kuroko, 2011
Cosmopterix jiangxiella Kuroko & Y.Q. Liu, 2005
Cosmopterix karsholti Koster, 2010
Cosmopterix kerzhneri Sinev, 1982
Cosmopterix kurilensis Sinev, 1985
Cosmopterix kurokoi Sinev, 1985
Cosmopterix kuznetzovi Sinev, 1988
Cosmopterix laetifica Meyrick, 1909
Cosmopterix laetificoides Sinev, 1993
Cosmopterix langmaidi Koster, 2010
Cosmopterix latilineata Kuroko, 1987
Cosmopterix lautissimella Amsel, 1968
Cosmopterix lespedezae Walsingham, 1882
Cosmopterix licnura Meyrick, 1909
Cosmopterix lienigiella Zeller, 1846
Cosmopterix ligyrodes Meyrick, 1915
Cosmopterix longilineata Kuroko, 1987
Cosmopterix longivalvella Kuroko & Y.Q. Liu, 2005
Cosmopterix lummyae Koster, 2010
Cosmopterix lungsuana Kuroko, 2008
Cosmopterix luteoapicalis Sinev, 2002
Cosmopterix lysithea Koster, 2010
Cosmopterix macroglossa Meyrick, 1913
Cosmopterix macrula Meyrick, 1897
Cosmopterix madeleinae Landry, 2001
Cosmopterix magophila Meyrick, 1919
Cosmopterix manipularis Meyrick, 1909
Cosmopterix margaritae Kuroko, 2011
Cosmopterix maritimella Sinev, 1985
Cosmopterix melanarches Meyrick, 1928
Cosmopterix metis Koster, 2010
Cosmopterix minutella Beutenmüller, 1889
Cosmopterix mneme Koster, 2010
Cosmopterix molybdina Hodges, 1962
Cosmopterix montisella Chambers, 1875
Cosmopterix mystica Meyrick, 1897
Cosmopterix nanshanella Kuroko & Y.Q. Liu, 2005
Cosmopterix navarroi Koster, 2010
Cosmopterix neodesma Meyrick, 1915
Cosmopterix nieukerkeni Koster, 2010
Cosmopterix nishidai Koster, 2010
Cosmopterix nitens Walsingham, 1889
Cosmopterix nonna Clarke, 1986
Cosmopterix nyctiphanes Meyrick, 1915
Cosmopterix ochleria Walsingham, 1909
Cosmopterix omelkoi Sinev, 1993
Cosmopterix opulenta Braun, 1919
Cosmopterix orichalcea Stainton, 1861
Cosmopterix ornithognathosella Mey, 1998
Cosmopterix orthosie Koster, 2010
Cosmopterix oxyglossa Meyrick, 1909
Cosmopterix pallifasciella Snellen, 1897
Cosmopterix paltophanes Meyrick, 1909
Cosmopterix panayella Mey, 1998
Cosmopterix panopla Meyrick, 1909
Cosmopterix pararufella Riedl, 1976
Cosmopterix pentachorda Meyrick, 1915
Cosmopterix phaeogastra Meyrick, 1917
Cosmopterix phaesphora Turner, 1923 
Cosmopterix phyladelphella Sinev, 1985
Cosmopterix phyllostachysea Kuroko, 1975
Cosmopterix pimmaarteni Koster, 2010
Cosmopterix plesiasta Meyrick, 1919
Cosmopterix plumbigutella Kuroko, 1987
Cosmopterix pocsi Sinev, 1988
Cosmopterix praxidike Koster, 2010
Cosmopterix pseudomontisella Sinev, 1988
Cosmopterix pulchrimella Chambers, 1875
Cosmopterix pustulatella Snellen, 1897
Cosmopterix pyrozela Meyrick, 1922
Cosmopterix quadrilineella Chambers, 1878
Cosmopterix rhyncognathosella Sinev, 1985
Cosmopterix rumakomi Kuroko, 1987
Cosmopterix salahinella Chretien, 1907
Cosmopterix saltensis Koster, 2010
Cosmopterix sapporensis Matsumura, 1931
Cosmopterix scaligera Meyrick, 1909
Cosmopterix schmidiella Frey, 1856
Cosmopterix schouteni Koster, 2010
Cosmopterix scirpicola Hodges, 1962
Cosmopterix scribaiella Zeller, 1850
Cosmopterix semnota Meyrick, 1914
Cosmopterix setariella Sinev, 1985
Cosmopterix sharkovi Sinev, 1988
Cosmopterix sibirica Sinev, 1985
Cosmopterix sichuanella Kuroko & Y.Q. Liu, 2005
Cosmopterix similis Walsingham, 1897
Cosmopterix sinelinea Hodges, 1978
Cosmopterix spiculata Meyrick, 1909
Cosmopterix splendens Sinev, 1985
Cosmopterix subsplendens Sinev, 1988
Cosmopterix tabellaria Meyrick, 1908
Cosmopterix taygete Koster, 2010
Cosmopterix teligera Meyrick, 1915
Cosmopterix tenax Meyrick, 1915
Cosmopterix tetrophthalma Meyrick, 1921
Cosmopterix thebe Koster, 2010
Cosmopterix thelxinoe Koster, 2010
Cosmopterix themisto Koster, 2010
Cosmopterix thrasyzela Meyrick, 1915
Cosmopterix thyone Koster, 2010
Cosmopterix toraula Meyrick, 1911
Cosmopterix transcissa Meyrick, 1914
Cosmopterix trifasciella Koster, 2010
Cosmopterix trilopha Meyrick, 1922
Cosmopterix turbidella Rebel, 1896
Cosmopterix vanderwolfi Koster, 2010
Cosmopterix vexillaris Meyrick, 1909
Cosmopterix victor Stringer, 1930
Cosmopterix wongsirii Kuroko, 1987
Cosmopterix xanthura Walsingham, 1909
Cosmopterix xuthogastra Meyrick, 1910
Cosmopterix yvani Landry, 2001
Cosmopterix zathea Meyrick, 1917
Cosmopterix zenobia Meyrick, 1921
Cosmopterix zieglerella Hubner, 1810

Status unknown
Cosmopterix phengitella (Hübner, 1811), described from Europe in Tinea

Selected former species
Cosmopterix ceriocosma Meyrick, 1934
Cosmopterix labathiella Viette, 1956

Furthermore, "Cosmopterix" cyanosticta is not a cosmet moth, but belongs to the fungus moth genus Erechthias.

References

External links